Daniel Slawson Horton (December 24, 1879 – November 4, 1954) was an American track and field athlete who competed at the 1900 Summer Olympics in Paris, France. He was born and died in New York City.

Horton competed in the triple jump. His place and distance are unknown, though he did not finish in the top six. Similarly, he did not make the top four in the standing triple jump.

References

External links 

 De Wael, Herman. Herman's Full Olympians: "Athletics 1900". Accessed 18 March 2006.
 

1879 births
1954 deaths
Athletes (track and field) at the 1900 Summer Olympics
Olympic track and field athletes of the United States
American male triple jumpers
Track and field athletes from New York City